Hunan Women's University is a university located in Yuhua District, Changsha, Hunan, China.

As of fall 2013, the university has one campus, a combined student body of 9,500 students, 524 faculty members.

The university consists of 4 colleges and 9 departments, with 24 specialties for undergraduates. The university covers a total area of 577 mu, with more than 200,000 square meters of floor space.

As of 2021, Hunan Women's University ranked first in Hunan and 14th nationwide among universities specialized in language teaching and research in the recognized Best Chinese Universities Ranking.

History

Hunan Women's University was founded in 1985, it was initially called "Hunan Women's Vocational College".

On March 18, 2010, it renamed "Hunan Women's University".

Academics

 School of Political Science
 School of Continuing Education
 School of Physical Education
 School of International Studies
 Department of Economic Management
 Department of Education and Law
 Department of Literature and Media
 Department of Foreign Languages     
 Department of Art and Design 
 Department of Art Acting
 Department of Information Technology 
 Department of Accounting
 Department of Tourism

Library collections
Hunan Women's University's total collection amounts to more than 1 million items.

Culture
 Motto:

References

External links

Universities and colleges in Hunan
Educational institutions established in 1985
Education in Changsha
1985 establishments in China
Women's universities and colleges in China
Universities and colleges in Changsha